is a company in Japan that sells "Konnyaku Batake" fruit-flavoured konnyaku jelly. MannanLife holds a 60 to 70 percent share of the konnyaku jelly market in Japan.

Sales of "Konnyaku Batake" were suspended from 8 October 2008 after it was reported that 17 children and elderly people in Japan had choked to death on konnyaku jelly since 1995. In 2009 they released the product Lala Crush.

References

External links

MannanLife website 

Food and drink companies of Japan
Companies based in Gunma Prefecture
Confectionery companies of Japan